Times Square is an entertainment and business district in New York City, United States.

Times Square may also refer to:

Places

Canada
 Times Square, a Chinese theme mall in Richmond Hill, Ontario

China
 Harmony Times Square
 Times Square station (Suzhou Rail Transit)

Hong Kong
 Times Square (Hong Kong), a shopping, entertainment and office complex in Causeway Bay

Malaysia
 Berjaya Times Square, a 2003 office and shopping center in Kuala Lumpur
 Penang Times Square, a complex of residential and commercial properties in George Town, Penang

South Korea
 Times Square (shopping mall), a shopping mall in Seoul

United Kingdom
 Times Square, a shopping centre in Sutton, London
 Times Square, Newcastle upon Tyne, the location of the Centre for Life complex

United States
Times Square (Detroit), a street in downtown Detroit, Michigan
 Times Square (Detroit People Mover), a Detroit People Mover station
Times Square – 42nd Street (New York City Subway), a New York City Subway station complex
Times Square – 42nd Street (IRT Broadway – Seventh Avenue Line)
Times Square – 42nd Street (BMT Broadway Line)
Times Square (IRT Flushing Line)
Times Square (IRT 42nd Street Shuttle)
Times Square Church, a church near Times Square, New York City

Vietnam
 Saigon Times Square in Ho Chi Minh City (formerly Saigon)

Other uses
 Times Square (1929 film)
 Times Square (1980 film)
 Times Square (soundtrack), 1980 soundtrack album for the film
 Times Square (Gary Burton album), a 1978 album
 Times Square (The Undead EP), an album by Bobby Steele
 Times Square, an unreleased album by Neil Young
 Times Square (Neuhaus), a sound art installation

See also
One Times Square, the location of The New York Times former headquarters building